The Bacillota (synonym Firmicutes) are a phylum of bacteria, most of which have gram-positive cell wall structure. The renaming of phyla such as Firmicutes in 2021 remains controversial among microbiologists, many of whom continue to use the earlier names of long standing in the literature.

The name "Firmicutes" was derived from the Latin words for "tough skin," referring to the thick cell wall typical of bacteria in this phylum. Scientists once classified the Firmicutes to include all gram-positive bacteria, but have recently defined them to be of a core group of related forms called the low-G+C group, in contrast to the Actinomycetota. They have round cells, called cocci (singular coccus), or rod-like forms (bacillus). A few Firmicutes, such as Megasphaera, Pectinatus, Selenomonas and Zymophilus, have a porous pseudo-outer membrane that causes them to stain gram-negative.

Many Bacillota (Firmicutes) produce endospores, which are resistant to desiccation and can survive extreme conditions. They are found in various environments, and the group includes some notable pathogens. Those in one family, the heliobacteria, produce energy through anoxygenic photosynthesis. Bacillota play an important role in beer, wine, and cider spoilage.

Classes 
The group is typically divided into the Clostridia, which are anaerobic, and the Bacilli, which are obligate or facultative aerobes.

On phylogenetic trees, the first two groups show up as paraphyletic or polyphyletic, as do their main genera, Clostridium and Bacillus. However, Bacillota as a whole is generally believed to be monophyletic, or paraphyletic with the exclusion of Mollicutes.

Phylogeny
The currently accepted taxonomy based on the List of Prokaryotic names with Standing in Nomenclature (LPSN) and the National Center for Biotechnology Information (NCBI).

Genera
More than 274 genera were considered  to be within the Bacillota phylum, notable genera of Bacillota include:

Bacilli, order Bacillales
 Bacillus
 Listeria
 Staphylococcus
Bacilli, order Lactobacillales
 Enterococcus
 Lactobacillus
 Leuconostoc
 Streptococcus
Clostridia
 Clostridioides
 Clostridium
 Selenomonas
Erysipelotrichia
 Erysipelothrix

Clinical significance 

Bacillota make up ~30% of the mouse and human gut microbiome. The phylum Bacillota as part of the gut microbiota has been shown to be involved in energy resorption, and potentially related to the development of diabetes and obesity. Within the gut of healthy human adults, the most abundant bacterium: Faecalibacterium prausnitzii (F. prausnitzii), which makes up 5% of the total gut microbiome, is a member of the Bacillota phylum. This species is directly associated with reduced low-grade inflammation in obesity. F. prausnitzii has been found in higher levels within the guts of obese children than in non-obese children.

In multiple studies a higher abundance of Bacillota has been found in obese individuals than in lean controls. A higher level of Lactobacillus (of the Bacillota phylum) has been found in obese patients and in one study, obese patients put on weight loss diets showed a reduced amount of Bacillota within their guts.

Diet changes in mice have also been shown to promote changes in Bacillota abundance. A higher relative abundance of Bacillota was seen in mice fed a western diet (high fat/high sugar) than in mice fed a standard low fat/ high polysaccharide diet. The higher amount of Bacillota was also linked to more adiposity and body weight within mice. Specifically, within obese mice, the class Mollicutes (within the Bacillota phylum) was the most common. When the microbiota of obese mice with this higher Bacillota abundance was transplanted into the guts of germ-free mice, the germ-free mice gained a significant amount of fat as compared to those transplanted with the microbiota of lean mice with lower Bacillota abundance.

The presence of Christensenella (Bacillota, in class Clostridia), isolated from human faeces, has been found to correlate with lower body mass index.

See also 
 List of bacteria genera
 List of bacterial orders

References

External links 
 Phylum "Firmicutes"  - J.P. Euzéby: List of Prokaryotic names with Standing in Nomenclature

 
Bacteria phyla